Christmas cake is a type of cake, often fruitcake, served at Christmas time in many countries.

British variations

Christmas cake is an English tradition that began as plum porridge. A traditional English Christmas cake is made with moist Zante currants, sultanas (golden raisins) and raisins which have been soaked in brandy, rum, whisky or sherry. The cake may be covered in layers of marzipan, then icing and is usually decorated, often with plaid ribbon bands and Christmas models such as snowmen, fir trees or Father Christmas.

A Scottish speciality is the traditional Christmas cake, the "Whisky Dundee". As the name implies, the cake originated in Dundee, and is made with Scotch whisky. It is a light and crumbly cake, and light on fruit and candied peel; only currants, raisins, sultanas and cherries. There is also the Scottish black bun, of a similar recipe using whisky and often caraway seeds, eaten on Hogmanay.

Aside from candied cherries, some Christmas cake recipes call for angelica for green colour.

Coins were also occasionally added to Christmas cakes as well as Christmas puddings as good luck touch pieces. The usual choices were silver 3d piece, or sixpences, sometimes wrapped in greaseproof paper packages.

In Yorkshire, Christmas cake, as with other types of fruit cake, can be eaten with cheese, such as Wensleydale.

A cake that may also be served at Christmas time in the United Kingdom, in addition to the traditional Christmas cake, is the cake known as a "Yule Log, or chocolate log". This is a Swiss roll that is coated in chocolate, resembling a log.

The Christmas cake largely displaced the previously popular Twelfth-night cake during the Victorian era.

In other countries
In the United States, some people give fruitcakes as gifts at Christmas time, but they are not called Christmas cakes. In Canada, however, the same cake is instead called "Christmas cake," at least among the English-speaking majority.

In India, Christmas cakes are traditionally a fruit cake with many variants. Allahabadi cake is famous for its rich taste and texture. Many smaller and more traditional Christian bakeries add alcohol, usually rum, in the cake.

In Sri Lanka, Christmas cakes use treacle instead of cane sugar and include spices like nutmeg, cinnamon and black pepper.

In Japan, Christmas cake is traditionally eaten on Christmas Eve. The cake is simply a sponge cake, frosted with whipped cream, often decorated with strawberries, and usually topped with Christmas chocolates or other seasonal fruits, and a Santa Claus decoration. Christmas cakes of this style were originally released by Fujiya, and was popularized when they began sales at Ginza, the central commercial district in Tokyo. This was during the time when Japan was going through massive waves of Westernization, particularly by the upper elite class. Members of the upper class, who had a strong penchant for Western cultures in general, enjoyed Western style desserts as a delicacy. Thus, being a Western style dessert, Christmas cakes were associated with the idea of Western modernity and social status. Therefore, it was a major hit when the Christmas cakes were commercialized and became more affordable to the general public. Different shapes and styles of Christmas cakes are released across the countless numbers of confectionery stores in the country; the cakes are no longer tied down to the traditional form of round white cakes with strawberries and Santa Claus on top. The Christmas cakes today are symbolized as a ritual of Christmas celebration; specifically, the act of sharing the cake with family or friends.

In the Philippines, Christmas cakes are bright rich yellow pound cakes with macerated nuts or fruitcakes of the British fashion. Both are soaked in copious amounts of brandy or rum mixed with a simple syrup of palm sugar and water.  Traditionally, civet musk is added, but rosewater or orange flower water is more common now, as civet musk has become very expensive. These liquor-laden cakes can usually stay fresh for many months provided they are handled properly. Another traditional Filipino Christmas cake is the crema de fruta, which is a sponge cake layered with sweet custard or whipped cream, gelatin or gulaman (agar), and various preserved or fresh fruits, including mangoes, pineapples, cherries, and strawberries.

In Cyprus,  Christmas cake is much like the UK and is served on Christmas Day. It is the first treat the locals serve to their guests. 

In Germany, Stollen, a traditional German fruitcake, is popular. During the Christmas season, it's also called Weihnachtsstollen or Christstollen.

In Italy, Panettone, a sweet sourdough bread with a distinct cupola shape, is traditionally eaten at Christmas. It contains raisins and candied citrus fruit and is prepared meticulously over several days. Pandoro is a typically a Veronese product. Is traditionally shaped like a frustum with an eight-pointed star section. The "Pandolce Genovese" is also a famous Christmas cake. The name "Genovese" refers to its city of origin, Genoa. It is similar to a British fruitcake, but less tall and more crumbly.

In France, Belgium, Switzerland, French Canada, Luxembourg and Lebanon a Bûche de noël (Yule log cake) is the traditional Christmas cake. They are light sponge cakes covered with a layer of butter cream flavoured with chocolate, coffee and Grand Marnier. Then rolled, covered with another layer of butter cream which is streaked and sprinkled with powdered sugar to simulate a log of wood covered with snow.
The Yule Log cakes are often garnished with Christmas-themed sugar or plastic decorations.

Its origins comes from the large wooden log called Yule Log that was burned in the hearth for several days at Christmas time since at least the Middle Ages throughout Europe and a French pastry chef to represent in the form of dessert in the nineteenth century. It contains no fruit.

Japanese metaphor
Christmas is a very busy secular holiday for patisseries in Japan, and Japanese Christmas cakes are created with a wide variety of flavours, ingredients and colours.

In Japan, women had traditionally been expected to marry at a young age, and those who were unmarried after the age of 25 were metaphorically referred to as (unsold) Christmas cakes (クリスマスケーキ) in reference to items which are still unsold after the 25th. The term first became popular during the 1980s but has since become less common because Japanese women today can remain unmarried with somewhat less stigmatization. An equivalent term does, however, still exist that hearkens to the "unsold" nature of unmarried women, urenokori (売れ残り, "unsold goods").

See also
Christmas pudding
Simnel cake

References

External links

Cakes
Christmas food
Almond dishes
Christian cuisine
Christmas cakes